Armavir, is a town and urban municipal community located in the west of Armenia serving as the administrative centre of Armavir Province. It was founded in 1931 by the government of the Armenian Soviet Socialist Republic. As of the 2011 census, the population of the town is 29,319, declined from 46,900 reported at the 1989 census. Currently, the town has a population of 37,053 as per the 2019 official estimate.

The town was known as Sardarabad before 1935, and Hoktemberyan from 1935 to 1995. Currently, Armavir is the seat of the Diocese of Armavir of the Armenian Apostolic Church.

Etymology
Founded in 1931 as Sardarabad, the town was known as Hoktemberyan (meaning the city of October) between 1935 and 1995, named in honor of the October Revolution.

In 1992, the town was named Armavir by the government of independent Armenia, after the nearby ancient city of Armavir, that was founded in the 8th century BC by King Argishti I of Urartu, and became the capital of the Kingdom of Armenia under the Orontid Dynasty in 331 BC.

History

Historically, the territory of modern-day Armavir is located in the Aragatsotn canton at the centre of Ayrarat; the 15th province of ancient Greater Armenia.

The Soviet 11th Red Army invaded Armenia on 29 November 1920, and a few days later Armenia became an official part of the Soviet Union on 2 December 1920. The Soviets proclaimed Armenia as a Soviet Socialist Republic under the leadership of Aleksandr Myasnikyan. However, in 1922, Armenia was included in the newly created Transcaucasian Soviet Federated Socialist Republic.

By the decision of the Soviet government, the settlement of Armavir was founded as Sardarabat on 26 July 1931, only 8 km north of the ancient city of Armavir, to become the regional centre of the Hoktemberyan raion created earlier in 1930 (known as Ghurdughuli raion until 1935). It was originally founded as a railway station connecting Yerevan with Leninakan (Gyumri). The first major urban plan of the town was introduced by architect Alexander Tamanian.

In 1935, the name of the settlement was changed from Sardarabat to Hoktemberyan in honor of the 1917 October Revolution. At the beginning, it was home to Armenian families who migrated from Javakheti, Shirak and Zangezur. During the 1940s, many Yazidis and Kurds from the nearby villages have also settled in Hoktemberyan. With the rapid development of the settlement as an industrial hub, Hoktemberyan was given the status of a town in 1947.

The population of the town was further increased in the 1950s and 1960s upon the arrival of repatriated Armenian families from Iran, Syria and Lebanon. In 1966, the Armavir branch of the Yerevan Brandy Company was opened. In 1967, Hoktemberyan became a city of republican subordination.

Following the independence of Armenia in 1991, Hoktemberyan was renamed Armavir on 7 November 1995, to become the provincial centre of the newly-formed Armavir Province, as per the 1995 administrative reforms of Armenia.

Geography
Modern-day Armavir occupies an area of 8.51 km² within the fertile Ararat plain, at a road distance of 47 km west of the capital Yerevan.

The territory around Armavir is among the most important regions of Ancient Armenia. The town is built 6 km northeast of the ancient city of Argishtikhinili and 8 km north of historic Armavir. The region corresponds with the Aragatsotn canton of the ancient Armenian Kingdom.

The town is surrounded by many large villages including Sardarapat, Norapat, Mrgashat, Maysisyan and Noravan.

Climate
Armavir has a cold semi-arid climate (Köppen climate classification BSk), with mildly cold winters and hot summers. The average temperature in January is –3.2 °C and +25 °C in July. The annual precipitation level is around 305 mm.

Demographics

Upon its foundation in 1931, the town was originally populated by Armenians from Javakheti, Shirak and Zangezur. Later, Yazidis, Kurds and Assyrians from the nearby villages have also settled in Armavir. Many Armenians from Iran, Syria and Lebanon were resettled in Armavir during the 1950s and 1960s, as part of the Armenian repatriation process.

The town's population reached its peak with around 47,000 during the final years of the Soviet Union. Following the independence of Armenia and the resulting economic crisis, it has drastically declined, showing 32,034 in the 2001 census, 29,319 in the 2011 census, and around 28,900 as per the 2016 official estimate.

The town's Saint Gregory of Narek Church was opened on 30 May 2014 and named after . Since its consecration in 2014, the church became the seat of the Diocese of Armavir of the Armenian Apostolic Church.

The healthcare in the town is served by the Armavir Medical Center, with a capacity of 280 beds.

Culture
The territory of modern-day Armavir is surrounded with many archaeological sites that are considered major centers of ancient Armenian civilization, including the nearby settlements of Metsamor, ancient Armavir, and ancient Argishtikhinili.

Currently, Armavir is served by a cultural center, commonly known as the Red Club. It is also home to a music school, a school of arts, five public libraries, and a theatrical group. There is a private zoological/botanical garden at the northeastern vicinity of the town.

In 2016, the town celebrated the 85th anniversary of its foundation, with the presence of delegates from the Russian cities of Armavir and Shakhty.

Transportation

The town of Armavir is founded on the basis of the train station operating since 1927, as a railway junction between Yerevan and Leninakan/Gyumri. The station was renovated i the 2000s. In November 2009, the station was provided with an electric locomotive that connects Armavir with the Aragatsavan station and northwestern Armenia.

The town is also connected with Yerevan and central Armenia through the M-5 Motorway. The H-17 regional road connects Armavir with Gyumri and other parts of northern Armenia.

Economy

Since its foundation, Armavir has gradually developed as an important centre for industries, as well as services. The industry of the town is mainly based on food-processing and building materials production.

The cotton mill of Armavir opened in 1928 was the first industrial plant of the town. The Hoktemberyan Cannery, which opened in 1943, was among the largest food-processing plants in the Soviet Union. The Armavir branch of the Yerevan Brandy Company has operated since 1966. The glass factory of Armavir is a major glass container producer for the entire republic. There is a water treatment facility in the eastern suburbs of the town.

As a provincial centre, Armavir is home to many branches of prominent banks currently operating in Armenia.

Armavir air base was built near the town during the early 20th century and became one of the largest jet pilot training centers for the Soviet Air Force.

Education
As of 2015, Armavir has 10 public schools, 12 nurseries, 2 intermediate colleges, 3 sport schools, and a school for children with special needs. Armavir is also home to the Tigran Mets Sports and Military College.

The Armavir provincial medical centre is located in the town as well.

Sport

FC Armavir was the football club who represented the town during the Soviet years. It was founded in 1965 as FC Sevan Hoktemberyan. After the collapse of the Soviet Union, FC Armavir participated in the Armenian Leagues mainly throughout the 1990s. The club was dissolved in 2003 due to financial difficulties. The club used to play their home games at the Jubilee Stadium which has a capacity of 10,000 spectators. In 1985, the stadium hosted one group match during the FIFA World Youth Championship hosted by the Soviet Union. Nowadays, it is serving the young teams of the Armavir football school.

In February 2017, the Football Federation of Armenia has launched the construction of a football academy in Armavir. With an approximate cost of US$3 million, the construction is being jointly financed by the FFA, UEFA and FIFA. It is expected to be completed by October 2019.

Martial arts including judo, muay thai sambo and taekwondo are also popular in the town. The Mayor's cup tournament of judo is annually held in Armavir. The town's sport school was entirely renovated in 2007.

Twin towns – sister cities

Armavir is twinned with:
 Allauch, France
 Armavir, Russia
 Feodosiya, Ukraine
 Shakhty, Russia
 Kerman, Iran

See also 
Armavir (ancient city)
Armavir (village)
Armavir, Russia

References

External links

 www.armavir.agro.am

Further reading
  Tirac'yan, Georg. "Armawir." Translated from Armenian by Aida Tcharkhtchian and edited by Jean-Pierre Mahé. Revue des Études Arméniennes. vol. 27, 1998–2000, pp. 135–300.

Populated places in Armavir Province
Erivan Governorate